Ladostigil (TV-3,326) is a novel neuroprotective agent being investigated for the treatment of neurodegenerative disorders like Alzheimer's disease, Lewy body disease, and Parkinson's disease. It acts as a reversible acetylcholinesterase and butyrylcholinesterase inhibitor, and an irreversible monoamine oxidase B inhibitor, and combines the mechanisms of action of older drugs like rivastigmine and rasagiline into a single molecule. In addition to its neuroprotective properties, ladostigil enhances the expression of neurotrophic factors like GDNF and BDNF, and may be capable of reversing some of the damage seen in neurodegenerative diseases via the induction of neurogenesis. Ladostigil also has antidepressant effects, and may be useful for treating comorbid depression and anxiety often seen in such diseases as well.

See also 
 Mofegiline
 Rasagiline
 Selegiline

References 

Acetylcholinesterase inhibitors
Propargyl compounds
1-Aminoindanes
Carbamates
Monoamine oxidase inhibitors